The following is a timeline of the history of Reading, the county town of Berkshire in England.

Events

Up to 1699
 8th century – Anglo-Saxon settlement of Britain: Settlement of "Readingum" founded by Anglo-Saxons, probably of the Readingas tribe, at the confluence of the Rivers Thames and Kennet.
 870 – Vikings capture Reading.
 871 – 4 January: First Battle of Reading: Vikings defend the settlement at Reading.
 979 – Reading Nunnery established by Queen Ælfthryth.
 1006 – Vikings burn Reading.
 1121 – June: Reading Abbey founded by King Henry I. Hugh of Amiens becomes first abbot. St Laurence's Church is built alongside.
 1125 – 29 March: Charter granted to Reading Abbey, taken also as the founding date of Reading School.
 c.1134 – Leper hospital founded by Abbot Aucherius.
 1136 – 4 or 5 January: King Henry I is buried in Reading Abbey.
 c.1140–54 – Castle maintained at Reading by King Stephen.
 1163 – Robert de Montford is victorious in a trial by combat against Henry of Essex held on Fry's Island before King Henry II, whose court is in residence at Reading Abbey (where the loser spends the remainder of his life as a monk).
 1164 – Abbey church consecrated by Thomas Becket, Archbishop of Canterbury.
 1189 – Hospitium of St John the Baptist established.

 1213 – Parliament held in Reading by King John.
 1231 – 2 May: Earliest record of Caversham Bridge with its Chapel of St Anne.
 1233 – Franciscans arrive in Reading, being granted a site near Caversham Bridge.
 1241 – Parliament held in Reading by King Henry III.
 1253 – Merchant guild successfully petitions for the town's first charter to be granted by King Henry III, 1254.
 1261–4 – The earliest known text of the "Reading Rota", "Sumer Is Icumen In", is written at Reading Abbey (in mensural notation).
 1285–1311 – Franciscans establish a new Greyfriars.
 1295 – Model Parliament: As a parliamentary borough, Reading elects two members to the Parliament of England.
 1346 – Tournament held at Reading by King Edward III.
 1359 – 19 May: John of Gaunt, the king's son, marries Blanche of Lancaster at Reading Abbey.
 1384 & 1389 – Parliaments held in Reading by King Richard II.
 1434 – St Laurence's Church rebuilt.
 1440 – Parliament held in Reading by King Henry VI.
 1451–3 – Parliaments held at Reading Abbey by King Henry VI.
 1463 – First record of the election of constables.
 1464 – 14 September: At Reading Abbey King Edward IV reveals his previously-secret marriage to Elizabeth Woodville earlier in the year.
 1466 – Parliament held in Reading by King Edward IV.
 1486 – Reading School re-founded by King Henry VII on the site of St John's Hospital.
 1487 – New charter granted to the town by King Henry VII.
 1500s – Surviving houses in Castle Street built.
 1538 – Dissolution of the Monasteries:
 Greyfriars is suppressed.
 14 September: Shrine of Our Lady of Caversham is destroyed.
 1539 – 19 September: Dissolution of the Monasteries: Reading Abbey is suppressed and the Abbot, Hugh Cook Faringdon, indicted and hanged, drawn and quartered for treason, together with John Eynon (priest of St Giles') and John Rugg, on 14 November.
 1542 – Reading is granted a royal charter of incorporation permitting the burgesses to elect the mayor. Greyfriars becomes the guildhall.
 1548 – King Edward VI grants the lordship of Reading to his uncle, Edward Seymour, 1st Duke of Somerset and Lord Protector who in 1550 is overthrown for misdemeanors including misappropriating Abbey property.
 1551–5 – Church of St Mary the Virgin rebuilt with materials from the Abbey church.
 1560 – New charter granted to the town by Queen Elizabeth I.
 1566 – A civic coat of arms is granted to the town.
 1585 – Local mathematician John Blagrave publishes ‘'The Mathematical Jewel'’.
 1619 – Wiremaking in Reading first mentioned.
 1625 – Law courts temporarily relocated to Reading because of plague in London.
 1628 – Oracle workhouse opens.
 1634 – Original Vachel Almshouses built as St Mary's Almshouses in St Mary's Butts.
 1640 – 
 Silk manufacture in Reading begins.
 Kings Road Baptist Church founded.
 1642 – 4 November: English Civil War: Royalist garrison arrives.
 1643 – 13–26/27 April: Siege of Reading: The Royalist garrison is forced to surrender to Parliamentarian forces. The Abbey church is severely damaged.
 1656 – Reading Blue Coat School for boys founded by Richard Aldworth.
 1662 – First nonconformist meeting in Broad Street.
 1664 – First fire engine in Reading.
 c. 1671 – First meeting of Quakers in Reading.
 1688
 9 December: Glorious Revolution: Second Battle of Reading: Dutch soldiers of William of Orange with the support of townspeople defeat an Irish garrison of James II (led by Patrick Sarsfield) in a skirmish in and around Broad Street, the last battle fought on English soil and the only substantial military action of the Revolution; his force's success is influential in William's decision to proceed directly to London and claim the throne and in James's decision to flee the country.
 Watlington House built.

18th century

 1707
 Presbyterian meeting house built in Broad Street.
 New wooden High Bridge erected over the River Kennet.
 1714 – Reading–Puntfield (Theale) turnpike trust authorised.
 1718–1723 – The River Kennet is made a navigation from High Bridge to Newbury by John Hore.
 1718 – Reading–Basingstoke turnpike trust authorised.
 1723 – 8 July: First newspaper in Reading, the Reading Mercury, is published.
 1724 – First known freemasonry meeting in Reading, at the Mitre Inn.
 1738 – Origin of the Blandy & Blandy solicitors' partnership.
 1748 – Reading, Pennsylvania, established, named after the Berkshire town.
 1763 – Reading–Wallingford turnpike trust authorised.
 1778 – c. May: First pound lock at Caversham Lock constructed by Thames Navigation Commission, replacing a flash lock.
 1782 – Green Coat school for girls established.
 1784 – Major Charles Marsack, lately an army officer in British India, buys Caversham Park from Earl Cadogan. 
 1785
 25 July: 9-year-old Jane Austen (with her sister Cassandra) begins 18 month's attendance at Reading Ladies' Boarding School at the Abbey gateway.
 Simonds Brewery opened by William Blackall Simonds in Broad Street.
 1786 – Town Hall rebuilt; Compter Gate demolished.
 1788 – New stone High Bridge erected to a design by Robert Furze Brettingham across the River Kennet.
 1798 – St Mary's Church, Castle Street built by a secessionist congregation (façade 1840–1842).

19th century

 1800 – Streets of Reading first lit (with oil lamps) and piped water supply first provided (by a private company).
 1802
 Blake's Lock on the River Kennet is converted from a flash lock to a pound lock.
 Dispensary opened.
 1804 – Summer: Simeon Monument erected in the Market Place to the design of John Soane.
 1806 – Suttons Seeds established as corn merchants.
 1810 – End: Completion of Kennet and Avon Canal provides through water communication to Bath and Bristol.
 1813 – First recorded steamboat on River Thames at Reading.
 1814 – Simonds Bank established.
 1815 – First gasworks opens in Reading, in Bridge Street.
 1819 – Streets first lit by gas.
 1822 – Joseph Huntley begins biscuitmaking in London Street.
 1825 – Reading Mechanics' Institution first established.
 1829 – Scottish inventor Isaac Holden, teaching at the Castle Academy, develops a version of the lucifer friction match.
 1830 – c. Autumn: Caversham Bridge rebuilt with the Reading spans in wood and iron and the Caversham spans in stone.
 1831 – James Dymore Brown sets up the Royal Albert Brewery.
 1835
 9 September: The Municipal Corporations Act makes Reading a municipal borough with effect from 1 January 1836.
 Friends meeting house built.
 1836
 Reading Borough Police formed.
 Barrett, Exall and Andrews set up the agricultural implement manufactory known from 1864 as the Reading Iron Works.
 1837 – December: First foundation stone laid for a church designed by Augustus Pugin, St James's (Roman Catholic) on the site of Reading Abbey (opens 5 August 1840).
 1839 – 27 May: Royal Berkshire Hospital opens on land donated by Henry Addington, 1st Viscount Sidmouth.
 1840 – 30 March: Great Western Railway opens to Reading railway station from London Paddington and Twyford through Sonning Cutting and over Kennet Mouth, engineered by Isambard Kingdom Brunel; extended 1 June to Steventon; 30 June 1841 throughout to Bristol. 
 1841 – Cousins Thomas Huntley and George Palmer form the biscuitmaking partnership of Huntley & Palmers.
 1843 – 1 May: First interment at Reading Old Cemetery, established by the Reading Cemetery Company in 1842.
 1844
 Early: Henry Fox Talbot establishes a pioneering commercial photographic establishment in Reading.
 HM Prison Reading built as Berkshire County Gaol to the design of George Gilbert Scott with William Bonython Moffatt.
 1847 – 21 December: Great Western Railway opens to Newbury and Hungerford.
 1848 – 1 November: Great Western Railway opens to Basingstoke.
 1849 – 4 July: South Eastern Railway opens to its own terminus in Reading.
 1850 – Board of Health established and Reading Union Water Company begins construction of a water supply system...
 1852 – Reading Union Water Company completes construction of the underground Bath Road Reservoir, fed from a pumping station on the Kennet at Southcote Lock and filtered on site.
 1853 – Theatre Royal established in the former Mechanics' Institution in London Street.
 1854
 Corn Exchange and Market House built.
 John Heelas opens the drapery shop which becomes Heelas department store.
 1856
 23 March: Forbury Gardens, laid out with a "botanical character", are opened to the public by the Corporation.
 9 July: London and South Western Railway begins services to Reading.
 1860 – Art School opens.
 1861 – Assize Courts and police station built.
 1862 – Reading Gas Company formed by merger.
 1863 – Greyfriars Church is restored as a place of worship.
 1866 – All Saints' Church is opened for worship.
 1868
 July: The Summer assize for Berkshire is moved from Abingdon to Reading, effectively making the latter the county town (officially confirmed 1869).
 Bath Road Reservoir acquired by the Borough Council from the Reading Union Water Company.
 1869 – 24 July: Caversham Bridge, rebuilt in metal, reopens.
 c. 1870–1873 – Water turbine powered sewage pumping station installed at Blake's Lock as part of a sewerage and sewage treatment scheme.
 1871 – 25 December: Reading F.C. founded as an Association football club.
 1872 – Huntley, Boorne & Stevens absorbs the biscuit tin manufacturing business established in 1832 by Joseph Huntley. In 1918 it is bought by Huntley & Palmers.
 1875
 Caversham Lock rebuilt.
 Free Library opens.
 17 December: Edward Jackson establishes his gentleman's outfitters, moving to Jackson's Corner in 1885.
 1877 – Kendrick School is established for girls in Watlington House.
 1879 – January–May: Reading Tramways Company horse-drawn network constructed.
 1880 – Reading Gas Company bridge over River Kennet constructed.
 1881 – Brock Barracks completed.
 1882 – October: New Free Library opens in the Town Hall.
 1884 – Maiwand Lion, sculpted by George Blackall Simonds, erected in Forbury Gardens as a war memorial to men of the 66th (Berkshire) Regiment of Foot killed at the Battle of Maiwand and elsewhere in the Second Anglo-Afghan War.
 1885 – The Reading UK Parliament constituency is reduced to one member.
 1887 – 20 June: Queen Victoria's golden jubilee: a commemorative statue of her is erected in the town.
 1889
 1 April: Reading becomes a county borough under the Local Government Act 1888 and its boundaries are enlarged.
 Leslie Randall is appointed first Suffragan Bishop of Reading, serving until 1909. 
 1891 – Palmer Park opened.
 1892
 c. March: Horseshoe Bridge for Thames towing horses erected at Kennet Mouth by Great Western Railway Company to replace ferry.
 29 September: Reading University Extension College, predecessor of the University of Reading, is established; Halford Mackinder is first president.
 1895 – 20 November: Oscar Wilde is transferred to Reading Gaol where he is held until 18 May 1897.
 1896
 4 April: Amelia Dyer is arrested, and subsequently hanged, for the murder of a baby placed in her care, one of between seven and twenty probably killed by her since moving to the Reading area the previous year.
 7 July: Charles Thomas Wooldridge is hanged at Reading Gaol for uxoricide, inspiring fellow-prisoner C.3.3. Oscar Wilde's The Ballad of Reading Gaol.
 5 September: Reading F.C. play their first match at Elm Park.
 New water pumping station for the town at Fobney Lock begins operation.
 1897 – Reading Museum opens (on the site of Reading School house). It houses an 1885–1886 replica of the Bayeux Tapestry purchased by Arthur Hill for the town in 1895.
 1898 – June: Reading R.F.C. are founded as Berkshire Wanderers, playing their first match in September.

20th century

 1901
 British manufacture of the Pulsometer pump moves from London to Reading.
 Synagogue built.
 Population: 72,217.
 1902 – 9 August: Coronation of King Edward VII: a commemorative statue of him is erected in the town by the Sutton family.
 1903–1955 – McIlroy's department store in business.
 1903 – 22 July: Reading Corporation Tramways opens its first electric service, with its own generating station.
 1909 – First cinema in Reading opens.
 1911 – Caversham becomes part of the county borough of Reading.
 1914
 Jewish lawyer Rufus Isaacs, M.P. for Reading since 1904, becomes first Baron Reading.
 Refugees from Belgium arrive in Reading.
 1916 – January: War Hospitals Supply Depot, largely staffed by volunteer women, begins operation in Reading.
 1919 – Reading Corporation Tramways operates its first motor buses, from Caversham Heights to Tilehurst.
 1920
 June – Historical pageant in the Abbey grounds.
 First council houses built.
 1921 – 13 September: Royal Berkshire Regiment War Memorial at Brock Barracks unveiled.
 1922 – The Oratory School, a Roman Catholic boys' institution, moves from Edgbaston, Birmingham, to Caversham Park.
 1923 – 3 October: Reading Bridge, designed in reinforced concrete by L. G. Mouchel, opens across the River Thames.
 1926
 17 March: University of Reading chartered, the only institution to be newly granted full university status in the U.K. in the interwar period.
 April: New Caversham Bridge, designed in reinforced concrete by L. G. Mouchel, opens across the River Thames (official inauguration 25 June).
 Church of The English Martyrs (Roman Catholic), designed by Wilfred C. Mangan, completed.
 1929 – Easter: Reading Aerodrome opens at Woodley.
 1932
 27 July: War memorial to men of Reading and Berkshire unveiled at the entrance to Forbury Gardens.
 Reading Crematorium established in Caversham.
 Tilehurst Water Tower erected.
 1933 – 29 March: Miles Hawk aircraft first flies, at Woodley Aerodrome.
 1936 – 18 July: Trolleybuses in Reading first operate.
 1939 – 20 November: Reading Corporation Tramways closes.
 1942
 2 May: The Suffragan office of Bishop of Reading is revived, Arthur Parham being consecrated.
 6 May: The Oratory School moves to Woodcote House.
 1943
 10 February: Luftwaffe air raid in which 41 are killed.
 Spring: The BBC Monitoring Service moves to Caversham Park from Wood Norton, Worcestershire. It leaves in May 2018.
 1945
 1 May: BBC Monitoring Service at Caversham Park is the first place in the U.K. to hear of the death of Adolf Hitler, which will lead to the end of World War II in Europe on 7 May.
 Reading Festival Chorus formed.
 1946 – Progress Theatre formed.
 1947
 The University of Reading purchases Whiteknights Park to develop a new campus.
 Reading is twinned with Düsseldorf (Germany; officially 1988).
 Huntley & Palmers produce the cake for the November wedding of Princess Elizabeth and Philip Mountbatten, Duke of Edinburgh.
 The River Thames floods 1600 homes.
 1950 – Work begins on the council's Southcote housing estate.
 1951 – Later: Museum of English Rural Life is established at the university; it opens to the public on 27 April 1955.
 1953 – February: Progress Theatre give the first British English-language performance of Brecht's The Good Woman of Setzuan.
 1955 – Migrants from the Caribbean settle in Reading.
 1958
 7 April: The first protest march for the Campaign for Nuclear Disarmament from London to Aldermaston, demanding a ban on nuclear weapons, passes through Reading.
 Spring: Progress Theatre give the first performance in England of Seán O'Casey's 1923 play The Shadow of a Gunman.
 The first Little Chef diner is opened in Oxford Road by Sam Alper.
 1960 – First high-rise council flats built, at Coley Park.
 1961 – Civic Society formed.
 1964 – Bulmershe College opens.
 1965 – The Prudential assurance company opens administrative offices at The Forbury.
 1966
 Last Tilehurst brickworks, S. & E. Collier, closes.
 c. December: Yield Hall multi-storey car park opens.
 1967
 Western Tower completed as railway offices, the first major office tower in Reading.
 Brian Brindley becomes vicar of Holy Trinity Church which he transforms into a centre of Anglo-Catholicism.
 1968 – 3 November: Trolleybuses in Reading last operate.
 1969–1989 – Inner Distributor Road opens.
 1969 – 1 April: Reading Borough Police is merged into Thames Valley Police.
 1971
 25–27 June: The first Reading Festival "of jazz and progressive music" takes place.
 Friars Walk Shopping Centre opens and Broad Street Mall opens as Butts Centre.
 1974
 1 April: Reorganisation under Local Government Act 1972 takes effect: The County Borough of Reading becomes an administrative district of Berkshire.
 3 April–26 June: The Family, an early U.K. example of a fly on the wall documentary series, featuring the Wilkins of Reading, airs nationally on BBC1 television.
 1976
 8 March: First local radio station, Radio 210, begins broadcasting.
 Huntley & Palmers cease biscuit manufacture in Reading.
 Suttons Seeds move to Torbay.
 New civic offices completed.
 1977 – The Hexagon performance venue completed.
 1984 – American screen actor Stacy Keach serves 6 months in HM Prison Reading for possession of cocaine at Heathrow Airport.
 1985 – New Central Library built.
 1988
 27 March: Reading F.C. win the Simod Cup but are relegated to the Football League Third Division.
 Rivermead Leisure Centre opens.
 1989 – Merger of Bulmershe College of Higher Education into the University of Reading is completed.
 1990–2006 – The main annual U.K. World of Music, Arts and Dance (WOMAD) festival is held at Rivermead.
 1990 – 8 August: Kennet and Avon Canal officially reopened throughout as a leisure waterway.
 1994
 10 February: Church of England (Continuing) founded at St Mary's Church, Castle Street.
 Reading is twinned with Clonmel (Republic of Ireland) and San Francisco Libre (Nicaragua).
 1995 – Broad Street shopping area pedestrianised.
 1997 – 17 June: Reading Rockets basketball club formed.
 1998
 1 April: Berkshire County Council is abolished and the Borough of Reading becomes one of the unitary authorities in the area.
 22 August: Reading F.C. play their first match at the Madejski Stadium.
 1999
 February: Green Park Business Park opened by the Prudential, initially with Cisco Systems as main tenant.
 23 September: The Oracle shopping mall is opened on the site of the Oracle workhouse.
 The Church of St Mary the Virgin is raised to the honorific dignity of Reading Minster.

21st century
 2003
 Reading is twinned with Speightstown (Barbados).
 First gay pride march in Reading.
 2004 – Reading College and School of Arts and Design is affiliated to Thames Valley University.
 2005
 7 May: Murder of Mary-Ann Leneghan.
 November: Green Park wind turbine completed.
 2006 – Reading F.C. open their first season in the Premier League.
 2010 – March: Scottish Courage's Berkshire Brewery at Worton Grange, successor to Simonds Brewery in 1979/80, ceases production.
 2013
 September: UTC Reading, a university technical college, opens.
 November: HM Prison Reading closes.
 December: Jackson's outfitters closes.
 2014 – 17 July: Substantially rebuilt Reading railway station officially reopened.
 2015 – 30 September: Christchurch Bridge opens as a pedestrian and cycle crossing of the Thames.
 2017 – Digital station RG2 Radio established primarily to serve the local Afro-Caribbean community.
 2019 – 19 November: First woman consecrated Suffragan Bishop of Reading, Olivia Graham.
 2020
 23 March: Reading enters the national lockdown cycle caused by the COVID-19 pandemic in the United Kingdom.
 20 June: 2020 Reading stabbings: Three people are killed in a mass stabbing in Forbury Gardens.
 2021 – Autumn (projected): Reading Rep Theatre opens in a permanent venue converted from a Salvation Army hall.

Births
 c. 1492 – Thomas White, cloth merchant, Lord Mayor of London and benefactor (d. 1567)
 1573
 7 October: William Laud, Archbishop of Canterbury (executed 1645)
 John Kendrick, cloth merchant and benefactor (d. 1624)
 1718 – 12 December: John Cennick, evangelical preacher (d. 1755)
 1759 – 24 September: Charles Simeon, evangelical preacher (d. 1836)
 1795 – 26 May: Thomas Talfourd, lawyer, politician and author (d. 1854)
 1843 – 6 October: George Blackall Simonds, sculptor (d. 1929)
 1858 – 19 June: George Alexander, actor-manager (d. 1918)
 1869 – 23 December: Hugh Allen, conductor (d. 1946)
 1884 – 18 August: Basil Cameron, conductor (d. 1975)
 1886 – 14 January: Hugh Lofting, children's author, creator of Doctor Dolittle (d. 1947)
 1892 – 18 December: Fred Potts, trooper, recipient of the Victoria Cross (d. 1943)
 1903 – 29 March: Arthur Negus, antiques expert (d. 1985)
 1906 – 18 December: Evelyn Dunbar, war artist (d. 1960)
 1912 – 3 July: Elizabeth Taylor, novelist (d. 1975)
 1918 – 4 July: Alex Bedser, cricketer (d. 2010)
 1929 – 31 December: Peter May, cricketer (d. 1994)
 1930 – 24 November: Ken Barrington, cricketer (d. 1981)
 1932 – 24 October: Cormac Murphy-O'Connor, Cardinal Archbishop of Westminster (d. 2017)
 1943 – 14 May: Richard Peto, epidemiologist
 1953 – 15 May: Mike Oldfield, musician
 1961 – 25 June: Ricky Gervais, comedian
 1963 – Bob and Roberta Smith (Patrick Brill), slogan painter
 1965 – 1 August: Sam Mendes, film and theatre director
 1973 – 18 December: Lucy Worsley, historian
 1975 – 5 October: Kate Winslet, film actress
 1977
 23 April: Babita Sharma, radio journalist
 28 September: John Finnemore, comedy scriptwriter-performer
 1982 – 9 January: Kate Middleton, royal consort
 1983 – 6 September: Pippa Middleton, socialite
 1992 – 17 March: Eliza Bennett, actress
 1993 – 29 June: Fran Kirby, footballer

See also
 Oxford, Portsmouth, and Southampton

References

Bibliography 
 

Reading
 
Reading, Berkshire
Reading